Lectionary 2137, designated by ℓ 2137 in the Gregory-Aland numbering. 
It is a Greek manuscript of the New Testament, on parchment leaves, dated paleographically to the 12th century.

Description 

The codex contains some Lessons from the four Gospels lectionary (Evangelistarium) with some lacunae. The text is written in Greek minuscule letters, on 213 parchment leaves (32 by 24.5 cm), in 8-leaf quires. The text is written in 2 columns per page, 24 lines per page. It has breathings and accents. The nomina sacra are written in an abbreviated way. The initial letters are decorated.

The codex now is located in the Bible Museum Münster (MS. 17).

See also 

 List of New Testament lectionaries
 Biblical manuscripts
 Textual criticism
 Bible Museum Münster

References

External links 

 Lectionary 2137 at the CSNTM
 Manuscripts of the Bible Museum

Greek New Testament lectionaries
12th-century biblical manuscripts